Espresso Vivace is a Seattle area coffee shop and roaster known for its coffee and roasting practices. Vivace's owner, David Schomer,
 is credited with developing and popularizing latte art in the United States.

David Schomer
Espresso Vivace was founded in 1988 by former Boeing engineer David C. Schomer and Digital Equipment Corporation mainframe technician Geneva Sullivan, who were married at that time. Espresso Vivaces's first incarnation was a coffee cart at 5th and Union, serving mainly financial industry workers, whom Schomer says did not consistently frequent the same cafes or pay close attention to quality.

Schomer and Sullivan opened a second street-facing, covered stand near the Broadway Market QFC grocery, and later a larger roastery cafe on South Broadway. Both were in the Capitol Hill neighborhood, where customers took greater notice, though the Seattle Central Community College customers "didn't know any better" without other nearby coffee shops operating on the same gourmet level. To make way for the Capitol Hill light rail station they were forced to move, choosing a new location five blocks north, near "high-end housing." Here Espresso Vivace found customers who Schomer said were more able to appreciate gourmet coffee as an art form, and who generally became "rabidly loyal" to their favorite haunts. Sullivan and Schomer's business partnership continued after their divorce in 2008.

References

External links
 
 

1988 establishments in Washington (state)
Capitol Hill, Seattle
Coffee brands
Coffee in Seattle
Coffeehouses and cafés in the United States
Companies based in Seattle
Food and drink companies established in 1988
Restaurants in Seattle